Caroline Coade is an American violist who was born and raised in San Diego. She began playing violin at the age of 6 but switched to viola when she turned 14. She graduated from the Interlochen Arts Academy and then pursued her Bachelor of Music degree from the Oberlin Conservatory as well as the Artist Diploma from the Curtis Institute of Music followed by Master's from the Juilliard School. In those schools she was under guidance from Karen Tuttle, Joyce Robbins, Jeffrey Irvine, David Takeno, Dave Holland, and Eugene Becker. She is a participant of Great Lakes Chamber Music Festival, Laurel Festival of the Arts and Marlboro Music Festival. She has played in the Cleveland and Philadelphia Orchestras, as well as the New York Philharmonic. She currently serves as a member of the Chautauqua Institution Music Festival's faculty and Bowdoin International Music Festival as well, prior to which she also was a National Music Festival faculty member.

References

Living people
American violists
Women violists
Musicians from San Diego
Juilliard School alumni
Curtis Institute of Music alumni
Oberlin Conservatory of Music alumni
Year of birth missing (living people)